Charles E. Dyer (October 15, 1834November 25, 1905) was a United States district judge of the United States District Court for the Eastern District of Wisconsin.

Education and career

Born in Cicero, New York, Dyer read law to enter the bar in 1857. He was in private practice in Sandusky, Ohio from 1857 to 1858, and in Racine, Wisconsin from 1859 to 1860, and from 1861 to 1867. He was city attorney of Racine from 1860 to 1861. He was a member of the Wisconsin State Assembly from 1867 to 1868, returning to private practice in Racine from 1868 to 1875.

Federal judicial service

On February 10, 1875, Dyer was nominated by President Ulysses S. Grant to a seat on the United States District Court for the Eastern District of Wisconsin vacated by Judge James Henry Howe. Dyer was confirmed by the United States Senate on February 10, 1875, and received his commission the same day. Dyer served in that capacity until his resignation on May 18, 1888.

Later career and damage

Dyer was thereafter in private practice in Milwaukee, Wisconsin,  and general counsel to the Northwestern Mutual Life Insurance Company from 1888 until his death on November 25, 1905, in Milwaukee.

References

Sources
 

1834 births
1905 deaths
Judges of the United States District Court for the Eastern District of Wisconsin
Members of the Wisconsin State Assembly
United States federal judges appointed by Ulysses S. Grant
19th-century American judges
People from Cicero, New York
United States federal judges admitted to the practice of law by reading law